
Krosno Odrzańskie County is a unit of territorial administration and local government (powiat) in Lubusz Voivodeship, western Poland, on the German border. It came into being on January 1, 1999, as a result of the Polish local government reforms passed in 1998.

As of 2019 its total population is 55,018, out of which the population of Gubin is 16,619, that of Krosno Odrzańskie is 11,319, and the rural population is 27,080.

Neighbouring counties
Krosno Odrzańskie County is bordered by Słubice County to the north-west, Sulęcin County to the north, Świebodzin County to the north-east, Zielona Góra County to the east and Żary County to the south. It also borders Brandenburg in Germany to the west.

Administrative division
The county is subdivided into seven gminas (one urban, one urban-rural and five rural). These are listed in the following table, in descending order of population.

References

 
Land counties of Lubusz Voivodeship